Giancarlo Dettori (born 5 April 1932) is an Italian actor. He appeared in more than thirty films since 1957.

Selected filmography

References

External links 

1932 births
Living people
Italian male film actors